Azer Suleymanli (full name: Azer Sharif oglu Suleymanov; born 1986) is an Azerbaijani TV presenter. During his career, he worked in Khayal TV, Region TV, Space TV, Medeniyyet TV and Ictimai TV (the latter, until now). Azer Suleymanli hosted many programs such as The Voice of Azerbaijan and was the Azerbaijani commentator for 2016, 2017, and 2018 editions of the Eurovision Song Contest.

Life 
Azer Sharif oglu Suleymanov was born on 10 December 1986 in Ikinci Nugadi, Guba District of Azerbaijan. He received his education in Ikinci Nugadi Secondary School No. 1 in 1993, graduated from that school in 2004 and the following year, was admitted to the Azerbaijan State University of Culture and Arts. He graduated from the same university in 2009 with honours.

Career 
In 1999, when he was still in school, Azer Suleymanli started to host a show for Khayal TV (now Qafqaz TV), which operates in Guba District. Until 2007, he was the host of Bizim sinif, Dünya uşaqların gözü ilə, Hər bazar.  He continued his career as one of the first presenters of Region TV (now ARB TV), founded in 2007. Until 2016, he was the host of the programs Buralar, Azərlə hər bazar, AzərKeş, ÖYRƏNirəm. Azer Suleymanli worked at Space TV from 2008 to 2010. He hosted the karaoke program Mənim Sevimli Mahnım (MSM), as well as the last season of Azəri Star song contest.  Suleymanli was the host of the intellectual program 1001 sual on the Medeniyyet TV, which began broadcasting in 2011. He started to host the Şərq ulduzları children's song contest on Azad Azerbaijan TV in 2012.
 
Azer Suleymanli has been working as a presenter at the Ictimai Television and Radio Broadcasting Company since September 2013. During this time, he hosted the channel's morning program Yeni gün, and since 2017 Sabahın xeyir, Azərbaycan. In 2021, the Ictimai Television and Radio Broadcasting Company acquired the license to broadcast The Voice and the hosting of the project's local edition was entrusted to Azer Suleymanli. Suleymanli was also the Azerbaijani commentator for the Eurovision Song Contest three times in a row – in 2016, 2017, and 2018.
 
Azer Suleymanli hosted many state-organized events and projects. He also gave seminars on becoming a presenter at the invitation of many universities and youth organizations in the country. Over the years, he has been awarded diplomas and prizes by various government agencies, organizations and public associations.

Personal life 
Azer Suleymanli married on 13 September 2014.

References 

Living people
1986 births
Azerbaijani television presenters
Azerbaijani journalists
Azerbaijan State University of Culture and Arts alumni